Parasinophasma is a genus of Asian stick insects in the tribe Necrosciini, erected by S.C. Chen and Y.H. He in 2006.  Species have been recorded from: central-southern China (with records from Hong Kong) and Vietnam.

Species
The Phasmida Species File lists:
 Parasinophasma bouvieri (Redtenbacher, 1908)
 Parasinophasma bresseeli Ho, 2017
 Parasinophasma constanti Ho, 2017
 Parasinophasma fanjingshanense Chen & He, 2006
 Parasinophasma guangdongense Chen & He, 2008
 Parasinophasma hainanense Chen & He, 2008
 Parasinophasma henanense (Bi & Wang, 1998) - type species (as Micadina henanensis Bi & Wang)
 Parasinophasma laifanae Ho, 2017
 Parasinophasma liui Ho, 2017
 Parasinophasma luchunense Ho, 2017
 Parasinophasma maculatum Ho, 2015
 Parasinophasma sparsigranulatum Ho, 2017
 Parasinophasma tianmushanense Ho, 2015
 Parasinophasma unicolor Ho, 2015

References

External links

Phasmatodea genera
Phasmatodea of Asia
Lonchodidae